South Goa district is one of two districts that comprises the state of Goa, India, within the region known as the Konkan. It is bounded by North Goa district to the north, the Uttara Kannada district of Karnataka state to the east and south, while the Arabian Sea forms its western coast.

History
The Portuguese established a colony in Goa in 1510 and expanded the colony to its present boundaries during the 17th and 18th centuries. Goa was annexed by India on 19 December 1961. Goa and two other former Portuguese enclaves became the union territory of Goa, Daman and Diu, and Goa was organised into a single district in 1965. On 30 May 1987 Goa attained statehood (while Daman and Diu became a separate union territory), and Goa was reorganised into two districts, North Goa and South Goa.

Administration
 Asvin Chandru A, an officer of the Indian Administrative Service, is the Collector and District Magistrate of South Goa. There are deputy collectors and mamlatdars for each sub Division / taluka.

The headquarters of the district is Margao.

There are 205 revenue villages in South Goa District under 7 Tehsils (sub districts) headed each by the Mamlatdar.

Divisions

Margao is the administrative headquarters of the district. The 'Matanhy Saldanha Administrative Complex', the collectorate building, named after former minister and social activist Mr Mathany Saldanha, is  located on the outskirts of the city, adjoining the intercity bus stand.

The district is divided into five subdivisions—Ponda, Mormugao‑Vasco, Margao, Quepem, and Dharbandora; and seven talukas—Ponda, Mormugao, Salcete (Margao), Quepem, and Canacona (Chaudi), Sanguem, and Dharbandora.

Ponda taluka was shifted from North Goa district to South Goa district in January 2015.

Politics
  

 
|}

Transport
Frequent buses are available between Margao and North Goa.

Demographics

According to the 2011 census South Goa has a population of 6,40,537 which is roughly equal to the nation of Montenegro or the US state of Vermont. This gives it a ranking of 515th in India (out of a total of 640). Its population growth rate over the decade 2001–2011 was 8.63%. South Goa has a sex ratio of 980 females for every 1000 males, and a literacy rate of 85.53%.

Religion 

Hinduism (53%) is followed by the majority of population of South Goa. Christians (36%) form significant minority.

Language

At the time of the 2011 Census of India, 66.44% of the population in the district spoke Konkani, 12.38% Hindi, 6.45% Marathi, 5.98% Kannada, 3.39% Urdu, 1.00% Malayalam, 0.86% Telugu, 0.55% Bengali, 0.49% Tamil, 0.49% Gujarati, 0.44% Odia and 0.42% English as their first language.

Education
There are many educational institutions in South Goa. The prominent colleges include:
 Birla Institute of Technology and Science, Pilani – Goa Campus in Zuarinagar.
 The Parvatibai Chowgule College in Margao.
 Govind Ramnath Kare College of Law in Margao.
 Padre Conceicao College of Engineering (PCCE) in Verna.
 MES College in Vasco da Gama.

References

External links

South Goa district Website

 
Districts of Goa
1987 establishments in Goa